Teresa Kodelska (13 January 1929 – 17 November 2021) was a Polish alpine skier. She competed in three events at the 1952 Winter Olympics. Kodelska died on 17 November 2021, at the age of 92.

References

External links
 

1929 births
2021 deaths
Polish female alpine skiers
Olympic alpine skiers of Poland
Alpine skiers at the 1952 Winter Olympics
Sportspeople from Warsaw
20th-century Polish women